Zsolt Bíber (born 31 May 1976 in Szolnok) is a retired Hungarian shot putter. He represented his nation Hungary at the 2004 Summer Olympics, and also set his own personal best of 20.55 metres at the 2004 Hungary LG Cup in Debrecen. Throughout his athletic career, Biber trained as a full-fledged member of the track and field team for Újpesti Gym Club (UTE) under his personal coach and father Pál Bíber.

Biber qualified for the Hungarian squad in the men's shot put at the 2004 Summer Olympics in Athens, by scoring his entry mark of 20.55 metres from the LG Cup in Debrecen. Biber launched a 19.31-metre shot on his first attempt in the qualifying round, but his satisfying effort fell short to put him further to the final, placing twenty-fourth in the overall standings.

Personal best:

Indoor:   20.81m NR (Budapest OH 2004)
Outdoor:  20.55m    (Debrecen 2004)

References

External links
 
 
 Profile – Kataca.hu

1976 births
Living people
Hungarian male shot putters
Olympic athletes of Hungary
Athletes (track and field) at the 2004 Summer Olympics
People from Szolnok
Sportspeople from Jász-Nagykun-Szolnok County